Eliana García Laguna (born 21 February 1958) is a Mexican politician  and member of civil society organizations. As of 2003 she served as Deputy of the LIX Legislature of the Mexican Congress as a plurinominal representative.

References

1958 births
Living people
Politicians from Guerrero
Women members of the Chamber of Deputies (Mexico)
Members of the Chamber of Deputies (Mexico)
Deputies of the LIX Legislature of Mexico
Party of the Democratic Revolution politicians